Kyle Johnson may refer to:

Kyle Johnson (American football) (born 1978), American football fullback
Kyle Johnson (actor) (born 1951), American actor
Kyle Johnson (basketball) (born 1988), British basketball player
Kyle Johnson (tennis) (born 1993), American tennis player
Kyle Johnson, bass player in the progressive metalcore band Misery Signals